In its ten years of existence, two American Football League (AFL) rushing yards leaders were also AFL Rookies of the Year: The Dallas Texans' Abner Haynes in 1960, and the San Diego Chargers' Dickie Post in 1969.  Only two men won the rushing crown twice: the Buffalo Bills' Cookie Gilchrist in 1962 and 1964, and the Boston Patriots' Jim Nance, in 1966 and 1967.  All years had fourteen regular-season games.

See also
 List of National Football League rushing champions

References